Stonewall Jackson (November 6, 1932 – December 4, 2021) was an American country music singer and musician who achieved his greatest fame during country's "golden" honky tonk era in the 1950s and early 1960s.

Biography

Early years
Born in Tabor City, North Carolina on November 6, 1932, Jackson was the youngest of three children. Stonewall is not a nickname; he was named after Confederate General Thomas "Stonewall" Jackson. (Some publicity claimed he was a descendant of the general, but that is unlikely.)

When Stonewall was two, his father died after which his mother moved the family to Worth County in South Georgia, where he grew up working on his uncle's farm. Jackson enlisted in the Navy in 1950 and was discharged in 1954. He moved to Nashville, Tennessee in 1956.

Recording career
After hearing Jackson's demo tape, Wesley Rose, president of Acuff-Rose Music, arranged for Jackson to audition for the Grand Ole Opry. Jackson became the first artist to join the Grand Ole Opry before obtaining a recording contract. He toured with Ernest Tubb, who became his mentor. Jackson signed with Columbia Records in 1958.

His breakthrough came in the country Top 40 in late 1958, with a song written by a young George Jones, "Life to Go". It peaked at No.2 in early 1959 and his follow-up record, "Waterloo", was No.1 for five weeks, and crossed over into the Top 40 of the Billboard Hot 100 chart, where it reached No. 4. The track also reached No. 24 in the UK Singles Chart in July 1959. It sold over one million copies, and was awarded a gold disc. The song was a haunting and catchy tune that states "Everybody has to meet his Waterloo", meaning their fate. The song cites Adam, Napoleon and Tom Dooley as examples.

His next No. 1 hits came in 1964 with "Don't Be Angry" and "B.J. the D.J." (Jackson's foray into the teenage tragedy song trope, about an over-worked country music radio station disc jockey, who crashes his car in a rainstorm). In 1971, Jackson was the first artist to record a live album from the Grand Ole Opry with Recorded Live At The Grand Ole Opry. His other hit songs include "The Carpet on the Floor", "Why I'm Walkin'", "A Wound Time Can't Erase", and "I Washed My Hands In Muddy Water". Jackson also recorded a cover version of Lobo's 1971 hit, "Me and You and a Dog Named Boo", which became Jackson's final top 10 hit.

From 1958 to 1971, Jackson had 35 Top 40 country hits.

Later years
In 2006, Jackson sued the Grand Ole Opry for $10 million in compensatory damages and $10 million in punitive damages, claiming age discrimination. As a member of the Opry for over fifty years, Jackson believed management was sidelining him in favor of younger artists. In his court filing, Jackson claimed that Opry general manager Pete Fisher stated that he did not "want any gray hairs on that stage or in the audience, and before I'm done there won't be any." Fisher is also alleged to have told Jackson that he was "too old and too country". The lawsuit was settled on October 3, 2008 for an undisclosed amount and Jackson returned to performing on the show. He was a member of the Opry from 1956 until his death. He largely retired from performing by 2012, with his last public performance being at the funeral of his longtime friend George Jones.

Jackson lived on a farm in Brentwood, Tennessee where his wife Juanita died on January 11, 2019. She was also his personal manager and operated his song publishing company, Turp Tunes. He has a son, Stonewall Jackson Jr.

He was inducted into the North Carolina Music Hall of Fame on October 11, 2012. 

Jackson died in Nashville, Tennessee, on December 4, 2021, at the age of 89, from complications of vascular dementia.

Discography

Albums

Singles

References

Notes

Bibliography
Trott, Walt (1998). "Stonewall Jackson". In The Encyclopedia of Country Music. Paul Kingsbury, Editor. New York: Oxford University Press. p. 259.

External links
  Allmusic overview
 
 

1932 births
2021 deaths
People from Tabor City, North Carolina
American country singer-songwriters
American male singer-songwriters
Grand Ole Opry members
Country musicians from North Carolina
Singer-songwriters from North Carolina
American country guitarists
American acoustic guitarists
Guitarists from North Carolina
20th-century American guitarists
American male guitarists
20th-century American male musicians
Deaths from vascular dementia
Deaths from dementia in Tennessee
Columbia Records artists